Marina (Marianna) Pavlovna Basmanova is a Russian artist and book illustrator based in St. Petersburg.

Biography 
Basmanova was born in Leningrad in a family of artists. Both her father, Pavel Basmanov, a student of Petrov-Vodkin, and mother, Natalia Basmanova, were soviet artists and book illustrators.

She is well known as the partner of Joseph Brodsky, a Russian-American poet, over the period of 1962-1972. Together, they had one son, Andrei, in 1967, but were formally never married despite several marriage proposals from Brodsky. It has been said that Brodsky 'dedicated some of the Russian language's most powerful love poetry to her'.

Work 
In the end of 1950's Basmanova became the first student of Russian avant-garde painter, Vladimir Sterligov, who himself was a student of Kazemir Malevich. The first exhibition of her work was organised in 1959 in the apartment of artists Vladimir Sterligov and Tatiana Glebova. In 1960's she began working as an illustrator of children's books, several of which she has illustrated together with her mother, also an illustrator. In 1963 she did a series of portrait sketches of Anna Akhmatova, a Russian poet.

References 

Living people
1938 births
Artists from Saint Petersburg
Possibly living people
Russian children's book illustrators
Russian women illustrators
20th-century Russian artists
20th-century Russian women artists